The 1989 Japanese Grand Prix (formally the XV Fuji Television Japanese Grand Prix) was a Formula One motor race held at Suzuka Circuit, Japan, on 22 October 1989. It was the 15th and penultimate round of the 1989 Formula One season. The 53-lap race was won by Alessandro Nannini for the Benetton team, from a sixth position start. Riccardo Patrese finished second for the Williams team, with Thierry Boutsen third in the other Williams car. It was Nannini's only win.

The race is one of the most controversial in F1 history, as the culmination of Alain Prost and Ayrton Senna's tumultuous two-year rivalry as teammates at McLaren. The Japanese Grand Prix decided the 1989 Drivers' Championship in Prost's favour, after a collision on lap 47 at the final chicane between him and Senna put them both off the track. While Prost abandoned his stalled car, Senna restarted his, made a pit stop to change his front wing, and overhauled Alessandro Nannini to take victory. Following the race Senna was controversially disqualified for getting a push start from the marshals to rejoin the circuit, handing the title to Prost.

Pre-race
Going into this race, Prost had a 16-point lead in the Drivers' Championship over Senna, 76 to 60. The Brazilian had won six races to the Frenchman's four, including the previous race in Spain, but had only finished in the points on one other occasion, while Prost had only finished out of the points once all season. Therefore, Senna had to win both this race and the final race in Australia to have any chance of retaining his World Drivers' Championship. However, if Senna did win the last two races, he would be champion regardless of where Prost finished, due to the dropped scores system.

Qualifying

Pre-qualifying report
Nicola Larini was fastest in the Friday morning pre-qualifying session for the second Grand Prix in a row, the Osella driver just edging out Philippe Alliot in his Larrousse-Lola. A surprising third place was the Zakspeed of Bernd Schneider, who had not pre-qualified since the first race of the season in Brazil. The car's underpowered Yamaha engine had undergone some testing and development work since the last race, with some clear improvement made. "Our season starts here," Schneider said. The fourth pre-qualifying spot went to Michele Alboreto in the other Lola.

Larini's team-mate Piercarlo Ghinzani missed out this time in fifth place, with Roberto Moreno sixth in his Coloni. The Onyx team failed to get either car through to the main qualifying sessions for the first time since the third round at Monaco, as Stefan Johansson could only manage seventh after a fuel pump failure. Zakspeed's improvement could only help Aguri Suzuki to eighth place, his fifteenth straight failure to pre-qualify. Oscar Larrauri was ninth in the EuroBrun, ahead of the other Onyx of JJ Lehto. The AGS team had spent three days testing in France, but were both well off the pace in this session, with only Enrico Bertaggia's Coloni below them on the time sheets, as the Italian failed to post a time.

Pre-qualifying classification

Qualifying report
As expected, the two McLarens dominated qualifying. Even so, Senna was easily the class of the field, posting a time over a second and a half faster than teammate Prost. As would quickly become clear in the race though, Prost was aware early on in the event that the McLarens were sufficiently superior to all the other cars on the grid, that even with his car setup fully optimised for the race, he could qualify on the front row alongside Senna, but with a car setup far better suited to the demands of the race than his teammate – he would just need to beat the Brazilian off the line at the start and he would have a considerable advantage during the race, as would be seen. The Ferraris of Gerhard Berger and Nigel Mansell filled the second row, with Berger just edging his own teammate into fourth place by two-tenths of a second. The Williams of Riccardo Patrese was half a second behind Mansell in fifth place, and joining him on row three was fellow Italian Alessandro Nannini in his Benetton-Ford using the development HBA4 V8 engine. Behind Nannini positions were closely contested, with only six-tenths of a second covering the next six qualifying times, including that of former World Champion Nelson Piquet's Lotus-Judd in eleventh position. Jonathan Palmer's Tyrrell-Ford took the final grid slot in twenty-sixth place, while four failed to qualify (including former Ferrari drivers René Arnoux and Michele Alboreto who between them had won 12 Grands Prix), with nine drivers failing to pre-qualify.

Bernd Schneider qualified the Zakspeed-Yamaha for only its second race of the season (he also qualified for the season opener in Brazil). Schneider qualified 21st, only 4.851 seconds slower than Senna. Schneider's teammate Aguri Suzuki was not as successful in his home Grand Prix. After making his F1 debut for the Larrousse team at Suzuka in 1988, Suzuki recorded his 15th straight failure to pre-qualify the under-powered Zakspeed.

Qualifying classification

Race

Race report
To improve his straight-line speed, Prost had his Gurney flap removed before the race, without Senna's knowledge, as revealed by F1 journalist, Maurice Hamilton. At the start Prost got away much faster than Senna as he was hoping, instantly wiping out the Brazilian's pole position advantage. In fact, Senna's start was so poor that Gerhard Berger managed to get alongside him from his third place on the grid. But Senna's McLaren had the inside line into the first corner, and he managed to keep the Ferrari behind him. With a race-setup now clearly superior to his teammate's, over the first half of the race Prost steadily built his lead up to almost six seconds, and then Senna lost an additional two seconds due to a slow pitstop (by removing the Gurney flap, Prost had gone for a car setup with less downforce than Senna giving him more straight line speed and protection against all but the most extreme overtaking attempts into the circuit's one clear overtaking spot, the chicane at the lap's end). However, with a new set of tyres on the balance of power shifted, and the reigning World Champion began to reel in the Frenchman's lead.

Behind the leading pair, after his initial charge, Gerhard Berger's Ferrari gearbox failed on lap 34, and the sister Ferrari of Nigel Mansell suffered engine failure nine laps later. With the Scuderia's cars gone, all real challenge to the McLaren charge had evaporated. The only opposition left for Senna and Prost was each other as they were drawing away from the new third placed man Alessandro Nannini. The Italian's Benetton used the less powerful, but more reliable, HBA1 engine in the race and not the development HBA4. His teammate Emanuele Pirro did use the development V8 in the race, and while he was not as quick as Nannini, he did use it to move up to 10th after starting 22nd. Pirro's race ended on lap 33 after a collision at the hairpin with Andrea de Cesaris where Pirro ran into the back of his fellow Italian's Dallara.

Senna finally caught Prost on lap 40 (Prost had deliberately eased his pace, allowing Senna to follow him closely in his slipstream for the corners, at the expense of forcing Senna to use up his fresher tyres), and for the next five laps the gap between the two remained at approximately one second as the two McLaren drivers tried to position themselves tactically. Prost had greater top speed on the straights, while Senna's high-downforce settings gave him the advantage through the corners. On lap 47 Senna used his greater cornering speed to make sure that he remained close behind Prost's car through the challenging, double-apex Spoon Corner. This put Senna's car directly in the aerodynamic tow from the leading McLaren, negating much of Prost's straight line advantage. Through the infamous 130R, ultra high-speed, left curve, Senna cut Prost's lead still further, putting his MP4/5 only two car lengths behind his rival.

The next corner after 130R is the chicane, the second-slowest corner on the circuit. As Prost began to brake for the corner Senna dived alongside, but Prost saw the move in his mirrors and moved his car across the track to block his path (Prost had told team boss Ron Dennis before the race that in the past he had left the door open if Senna challenged so as not to take both team cars out, but he would not be leaving the door open on this day). Neither driver was willing to back down and the two collided just before the apex of the turn. With their wheels locked and their engines stalled, the two cars slid to a halt in the mouth of the partially blocked chicane escape road. As the vehicles were directly in the line of any possible out of control cars, the marshals hurried to clear them. While Prost unbuckled his belts and left his car (thinking this race was over and the World Championship finally settled in his favour), Senna gestured to the marshals to push his down the escape road. As the McLaren was pushed forward, Senna used the forward motion to restart his engine, and after it fired he immediately accelerated down the escape road, weaving between the temporary chicane bollards arranged in the roadway.

Although his car was running, Senna's MP4/5 had suffered damage to its front wing during the collision, and while Prost slowly wandered back to the nearby pit lane, Senna had to complete almost an entire lap of the circuit before pitting for a repair. Once his nosecone had been replaced Senna continued the race. Some indication of McLaren's dominance is shown by the fact that – despite the collision, the subsequent period spent stalled, the slow in-lap, and the pit stop delay while his car was repaired – when Senna rejoined the race he was only five seconds behind the new race leader, Alessandro Nannini.

Senna did not take long to catch Nannini's Benetton. He passed the Italian only two laps after having his nosecone replaced, in exactly the same place as the collision with Prost had occurred (unlike Prost, Nannini didn't put up a significant fight, a locked wheel and not an aggressively positioned car the only indication of how hard he tried to keep Senna behind). Two laps later Senna took the chequered flag. Nannini finished in second place, followed by the two Williams-Renaults of Riccardo Patrese and Thierry Boutsen who had driven in tandem and off the pace throughout the race. The only other driver on the same lap as the winner was Nelson Piquet; almost a lap down, but still far better placed than the eleventh position he started in, mostly due to the race's high attrition rate. Only eleven of the twenty-six starters were still running at the finish. Behind Piquet were two British drivers who also benefited from the misfortune of others, and while Martin Brundle's sixth-place finish was remarkable enough, Derek Warwick had come from the back row of the grid in his Arrows to take a seventh place. In a ploy that worked a treat for him, before the race Warwick had taken the extraordinary step of removing virtually all downforce from his car in the hopes that the extra straight line speed would give him an advantage.

Post-race
Immediately after the race, Senna was disqualified by race stewards for missing the chicane following his collision with Prost. Senna personally alleged that the decision had been made by FISA President Jean-Marie Balestre to give the championship to his fellow countryman Prost (the race stewards and Balestre both denied this was the case, stating that the FISA boss wasn't even present at the stewards meeting when the decision to disqualify Senna was made). Nannini was awarded the victory as a result, and he took the podium ceremony with Patrese and Boutsen. This would prove to be Alessandro Nannini's only victory in a Formula One career that was cut short by a helicopter crash almost exactly a year later, which severed his right forearm. Senna's disqualification also meant that it was mathematically impossible for him to overhaul Prost's points total, and so the 1989 Drivers' Championship went to the Frenchman.

As he had gained no competitive advantage by missing the chicane, Senna and McLaren attempted to appeal the disqualification ruling. McLaren boss Ron Dennis explained that it had nothing to do with stopping Prost (who was leaving McLaren for Ferrari) winning the championship, it was that the team strongly felt they had a win taken away from them by an incorrect ruling, and that resulted in a loss of prize money and bonus sponsorship money. At the FISA hearing in Paris later the same week, Senna's disqualification was not only upheld, but an additional US$100,000 fine and suspended six-month ban were imposed on the driver (FISA also labeled Senna as a "Dangerous driver"). Ever since the incident, there has been much debate as to whether Prost intentionally ran into Senna, whether Senna was overambitious in his overtaking move, or whether the collision was simply a racing incident between two embittered teammates.

Race classification

 Notes
  – Ayrton Senna originally finished 1st, but was disqualified for rejoining the track illegally following his collision with Alain Prost.

Championship standings after the race
 Bold Text indicates World Champions.

Drivers' Championship standings

Constructors' Championship standings

 Note: Only the top five positions are included for both sets of standings.

Footnotes

[2] Reali Júnior, Elpídio (6 November 1996). "Balestre admite ter ajudado Prost contra Senna". O Estado de S. Paulo. Retrieved 11 July 2017.

References

External links
Autosport/Atlas F1 "trial" of the collision case evidence.
Race summary at GrandPrix.com

Japanese Grand Prix
Japanese Grand Prix
Grand Prix
Formula One controversies